The area known as "Nickajack" generally refers to the rugged Appalachian foothills in eastern Tennessee and northeastern Alabama. "Nickajack" is a corruption of the Cherokee word  (Ani-Kusati-yi) which translates to Coosa Town, but more likely references Koasati Town.

History

In the late 18th century during the ongoing war with the Chickamauga, the area was inhabited by Chickamauga Cherokee and Muscogee-Creek warriors residing in the "Five Lower Towns" on the Tennessee River (near present-day Chattanooga).  The warriors were mostly made up of the Cherokee, led by Dragging Canoe.  Small groups of Shawnee and Creek lived with and fought with them, in addition to the occasional bands of Muskogee, who also served as allies.  Renegade whites; white traders; Spanish, French, and British agents; and runaway slaves also inhabited the area.

Town
After those wars, the settlement of Nickajack eclipsed the neighboring town of Running Water (Dragging Canoe's seat of operations) as the dominant town in the immediate area, due to its position on the river near the crossing of the "Federal Road" running from Athens to Nashville over the Tennessee River.  One of the town's more prominent residents, Turtle-at-Home (Dragging Canoe's brother), owned the ferry at that crossing and had other commercial interests.  In addition, Turtle-at-Home was on the council of the Lower Towns and served as Speaker of the Cherokee National Council.

Cave 

Nickajack Cave, formerly called Tecallassee, near the site of the former town, may have been used as a hideout and cache by the Chickamauga Cherokee.  Its deposits of bat guano were mined by Confederate forces during the Civil War, and the cave became one of the leading sources of saltpeter for the Confederate Powderworks at Augusta, Georgia.  The road used to transport the material became known as the "Nickajack Trail".

Civil War era 
The Nickajack region was a loosely defined region of North Alabama and East Tennessee where public sentiment adhered more strongly to the Union. In the period leading up to the American Civil War, there had been increasing talk of secession by the politicians representing the interests of wealthy plantation owners in the Black Belt that stretched across central and southern Mississippi, Alabama, and Georgia. Citizens in the more mountainous regions of North Alabama and East Tennessee, where slave ownership was less common, often remained in favor of the Union, believing, as some said at the time, that rebellion would become "a war for the rich, fought by the poor." A proposal arose, should Tennessee and Alabama attempt to secede, that adjacent territories in North Alabama and East Tennessee secede from their respective states and join into a new state called Nickajack that remained within the Union joined at the southeast corner of Kentucky. Nothing became of the idea, although Winston County, Alabama discussed secession. The area's reputation as the  Free State of Winston persists and was mentioned in the bestselling novel To Kill a Mockingbird.

Regional discord
On January 7, 1861, Alabama Governor Andrew B. Moore called delegates from Alabama to Montgomery for a convention to debate the Articles of Secession. Delegates from South Alabama wanted the convention delegates to determine the vote, while northern delegates wanted the issue put to a popular vote. Because the apportionment of delegates to the convention was based on total population (including slaves), the Southern delegates effectively voted "on behalf" of the African-American slaves, who made up a large proportion of the population in the region. The results of the poll determined that the balance of power would shift to the North, where the population was mostly white.

Ultimately, the Alabama Ordinance of Secession was passed by a vote of 61 to 39, split along geographic lines. In addition to Nickajack, Winston County, Alabama, threatened to form its own Free State of Winston. These threats of internal separation never materialized, but men in the region fiercely resisted conscription into the Confederate Army, with many joining the Union Army.

Notes

References
 Brown, John P.; Old Frontiers: The Story of the Cherokee Indians from Earliest Times to the Date of Their Removal to the West, 1838; February 1939
 Journal of Southern History; Vol. 5, No. 1; pp. 107–108
 Downing, David C.; A South Divided: Portraits of Dissent in the Confederacy; Cumberland House, Nashville; 2007; 
 US Army Corps of Engineers; Nashville District; accessed May 7, 2013

External links
The Civil War Omnibus

Tennessee in the American Civil War
Alabama in the American Civil War
Secession crisis of 1860–61
Southern Unionists in the American Civil War
Proposed states and territories of the United States